Bilitang is an administrative unit known as "Union Council" of Kohat District in the Khyber Pakhtunkhwa province of Pakistan.

District Kohat has 2 Tehsils i.e. Kohat and Lachi. Each Tehsil comprises certain numbers of Union council.  There are 27 union councils in district Kohat.

See also 

 Kohat District

References

External links
Khyber-Pakhtunkhwa Government website section on Lower Dir
United Nations
Hajjinfo.org Uploads
 PBS paiman.jsi.com 

Kohat District
Populated places in Kohat District
Union councils of Khyber Pakhtunkhwa
Union Councils of Kohat District